The 1985–86 Superliga Espanola de Hockey Hielo season was the 14th season of the Superliga Espanola de Hockey Hielo, the top level of ice hockey in Spain. Four teams participated in the league, and CG Puigcerda won the championship.

First round

Final round

Final 
 CG Puigcerdà – CH Jaca 5:3

External links
Season on hockeyarchives.info

Spain
Liga Nacional de Hockey Hielo seasons
Liga